Lanterloo or Loo is a 17th-century trick taking game of the trump family of which many varieties are recorded. It belongs to a line of card games whose members include Nap, Euchre, Rams, Hombre, and Maw (Spoil Five). It is considered a modification of the game of "All Fours", another English game possibly of Dutch origin, in which the players replenish their hands after each round by drawing each fresh new cards from the pack.

History 
In France it was originally called  ("Fly"), which was also the name of the five-card flush in that game and came to refer to the four-card flush in Lanterloo. Also called Langtrillo in its prime form and later simply Loo (also termed Lant in the north of England by 1860, most possibly for having evolved into a more elaborate form of play by the addition of new rules, it may also have been brought to England from Holland, where it was known as Lanterlu, Lanturlu or Lenterlui, or North Germany, where it was known as Lenter or Bester Bube. Whichever way it may have been, by the turn of the eighteenth century it was already England's most popular card game. The rules of Lanterloo are listed by Charles Cotton in 1674 and subsequent editions of The Compleat Gamester, while a late 18th century description is given in Covent Garden Magazine. Loo was considered a great pastime by the idle rich of that time, but it acquired a very bad reputation as a potentially vicious "tavern" gambling game during the nineteenth century.

Etymology 
Oxford English Dictionary quotes a 1685 reference to "Pam at Lanterloo", and William Chatto quotes a Dutch political pamphlet of about 1648 entitled Het herstelde Verkeer-bert verbetert in een Lanterluy-spel,<ref name=Chatto138>Facts and Speculations on the Origin and History of Playing Cards, William Andrew Chatto, p. 138, London 1848 (Dutch text): Vlaming: Was spel is dat, Vader Jems? ick weet niet dat ick dat oyt ghelessen heb, maer al die ghy genoemt hebt weet ick van. Vader Jems: O Bredder ! het is dat spel dat veeltijts genoemt werdt Labate, ofte om beter te seggen, Lanterluy.</ref> containing a dialogue equating the game "Labate" (hence French Triomphe became La Bête, "The Beast", in Cotton's Complete Gamester, see also Labet) with "Lanterluy". This was the very first mention of the game. Chatto also cites a 1777 Cumberland ballad which recounts that "at lanter the caird-lakers sat i' the loft." Lanter or Lant was Three-card Loo.

The name "Pam", denoting the ♣Kn in its full capacity as permanent top trump in Five-Card Loo, represents an old medieval comic-erotic character called Pamphilus (Latin for a Greek word, meaning "beloved of all") or "Pamphile", in French, described as "an old bawd" by the New Zealand-born English lexicographer Eric Partridge.

In the North German game of Bester Bube, older rules also specify the Knave of Spades as the top trump, but by the mid-19th century, the commanding card is the trump Knave and the second highest trump is the Knave of the same colour, the Under-Knave.

 Description 

The game is played by 3 to 8 players using a 52-card pack. The players play for tricks, and in each round they may pass or play. The main forms of the game are Three-Card Loo, Irish Loo and Five-Card Loo. The turn to deal and play passes always to the left.

 Five-Card Loo 

 Objective 

The pool is formed by dealer's contribution of five chips or counters. Then the players are dealt five cards each and the next turned for trump. Cards rank as at Whist, except that the knave of clubs, which is called Pam, is the highest trump. Everyone's aim is to win at least one trick, under penalty of increasing the pool.

The players, having seen their hands, can either abandon them free of charge or elect to play, thereby undertaking to win at least one trick for one fifth of the pool. Any player failing to take a trick is "looed", and adds five more chips to the pool. This amount goes for the next deal. Each player must have the same number of deals, but if there is a "loo" (the sum forfeited by a player who plays, but does not win a trick) in the last deal of a round, the game continues till there is a hand without a loo.

 Declarations 

Before play, each in turn announces whether he will play or throw his hand in.
Any player offering to play may then exchange from 0 to 5 of their cards from the pack and may not drop out or change them back.
If all pass, the dealer wins the pool.
If one player exchanges and the others all pass, the exchanger then wins the pool.

 Winning combinations 

When any person holds a Pam-flush (four cards of a suit with Pam), whether dealt initially or obtained by drawing cards, he can sweep the pool before playing. Then there is a new deal.

The next best hand to the above is a trump-flush (five cards of a trump suit) and this sweeps the pool, if there be not a pam flush; and there is also a new deal.

The next best hand is that of a flush of other suits, which sweeps the pool; and there is also a new deal.

When any of these flushes occur, each person, excepting those who hold inferior flushes or pam, is looed, and has to pay five counters into the pool.

 Play 

When none of these flushes occur, the game goes on as at Whist:

The player to the dealer's left leads to the first trick. He may lead any card in his hand. The other players, in clockwise order, each play a card to the trick and must follow suit by playing a card of the suit led if he has one. A player with no card of the suit led may play any card, either discarding or trumping. (Unlike three-card loo, it is not compulsory to head the trick). The trick is won by the highest card of the suit led, unless a trump is played, in which case the highest trump wins. The winner of each trick leads to the next.

When the Ace of trumps is played, it is usual to say 'Pam, be civil;' the holder of Pam is then expected to let the Ace pass.

 Payments 

When all the cards are played out, they will make but five tricks; and all the counters in the pool are divided between the holders of these tricks, in proportion to the tricks they hold, every other player being looed—that is, obliged to pay five counters, the amount put into the pool by the dealer, to the pool for next deal.

 Optional rules 

 Unlimited Loo. Each person looed must pay the whole amount of the pool.
 Running Pam. Pam is the Knave of trumps, instead of the Knave of Clubs
 Must. When only five counters are in the pool, everybody must play.
 Dealer takes the turned up trump, discarding any card in lieu of it.

 Three-Card Loo 

One card is dealt to each player, and the player receiving the lowest card is entitled to deal. At the commencement of the game the dealer puts three chips, or counters, in the pool, the value of which already been agreed upon by the players. It is necessary to make the pool a number that can be exactly divided by three, say 3, 6, 9 chips. After the cards are shuffled and cut, the dealer gives three cards (one at a time) to each player, beginning at the eldest hand, and going round to the left. An extra hand called Dumby, or Miss, is dealt in the center of the table and the next turned up for trumps.

In the first hand, and whenever the pool consists of only three chips deposited by the dealer, it is called a Bold Stand, or Force, and each player is compelled to play his hand, except the eldest hand, who, if he prefers it, is entitled to the Dumby and may exchange it for his own. Bold Stand is played for the purpose of getting a larger pool; thus, if eight are playing, and five lose, they will be looed the amount of the pool, raising the total of chips to eighteen. The deal passes to the left, and the dealer must on all occasions pay in the pool three counters for the deal. When the pool consists of more than the original three chips deposited by the dealer it becomes optional to play or not, and before looking at his own cards, the dealer asks all the players, beginning at the eldest hand, whether they will play their own hand, take the Dumby, or decline playing for that round. If the eldest declines to the Dumby, the next in turn has this option, and so on.

Whenever a player declines playing, he must give his cards to the dealer who will place them under the pack. No one can retract after declaring his intention to stand or not. When all players have declared their intention, the first in hand of those who play, if he holds two trumps, must head the trick. At the end of the game, the pool is divided into three portions. If one player takes three tricks, he wins the whole pool; if he takes two, he wins two thirds; if one, only one third. All those who have failed to win a trick are looed the original amount deposited by the dealer and when only two players stand, the last player before the dealer must either play he hand, or the Dumby, or give up the pool to the dealer.

An optional rule is "club law" whereby all must play if a club is turned as trumps.

 Irish Loo 

There is no Dumby, but each person can exchange his cards, as at Pam-Loo. Other rules are the same as at Three-Card Loo.

 Variations 

 Unlimited Loo 

Each player is looed the whole amount in the pool until the occurrence of a bold stand, which can only happen when three players stand the game, and each win a trick, or when two play, and one takes two chips and the other only one. The dealer being last in hand has always the advantage of knowing how many are to play before he decides. It likewise sometimes happen, when a large sum is in the pool, that none of the players consider it safe to stand, in which case the dealer takes the whole pool. This variation, also known as Loo the Board, forces those who lose the game to double the amount of chips in the pool, making it grow faster than in other forms of Loo.

 See also 
Mistigri, a variant of the original French game, Lanturlu
Nap
Euchre
Ombre

 References 

 Literature 
 _ (1773). The Covent Garden Magazine. Vol. 2. London: Allen.
 "Connoisseur" (1775). Annals of Gaming. London: Allen.
 Cotton, Charles (1674) The Compleat Gamester. London: A.M.
 1676: The Compleat Gamester, 2nd edn. Charles .
 Crawley, Captain Rawdon [George Frederick Pardon] (1863). Whist, Its Theory and Practice. With Chapters on Loo and Cribbage. 7th Edn. London: S.O. Beeton.
 Heather, H. E. (1876). Cards and Card Tricks''. The Bazaar, London.

External links 
David Parlett Website
 Modern Pocket Hoyle Dick & Fitzgerald Publishers, New York 1868. pgs. 183–185
Cassell's Book of In-Door Amusements. Card Games, and Fireside Fun (London 1881) pp. 128–129
The book of card games

17th-century card games
Rams group
Multi-player card games
English card games